This is a list of foundations in Canada. Foundations in Canada are registered charities. , Canada had 4,961 public foundations and 6,189 private.

Canadian foundations collectively comprise a very large asset base for philanthropy. As of 2003, there were over 2,000 active grantmaking foundations in Canada, who had total assets of CA$12.5 billion, with total grants given that year of over $1 billion. In 2018, public and private foundations held around $91.9 billion in assets and made $7 billion in grants.

The largest foundation in Canada  is Mastercard Foundation (private), with $23.7 billion in assets.

List 
The following is a list of foundations in Canada that have at least CA$10 million in assets, as per their most recent Registered Charity Information Return with the Canada Revenue Agency.

References

External links 
 Annual Registered Charity Information Returns from the Canada Revenue Agency
 Foundation Search Canada
 Ajah Fundtracker - online directory of all of the Canadian foundations

Foundations